Illinois Route 83 (IL 83) is a  major north–south state highway in northeast Illinois. It stretches from U.S. Route 30 (US 30, Lincoln Highway) by Lynwood and Dyer, Indiana, north to the Wisconsin border by Antioch at Wisconsin Highway 83 (WIS 83).

Route description 

IL 83 passes through Cook County, DuPage County, and Lake County. It begins as part of Glenwood–Dyer Road in Lynwood, and then follows Torrence Avenue though Lansing, 147th Street/Sibley Boulevard though Calumet City, Dolton, Harvey, Dixmoor, then north on Cicero, and then northwest on Cal Sag Road through Cook County. It then becomes known as the Kingery Highway through DuPage County, and then follows Busse Road, Oakton Street and Elmhurst Road in northern Cook County. In Lake County it is named McHenry Road in Buffalo Grove, Ivanhoe Road north of Mundelein, Barron Boulevard in Grayslake and Milwaukee Avenue in Lake Villa.
IL 83 ranges from a width of two thru lanes at either terminus to six lanes through DuPage County. It is the main north–south arterial route falling between Interstate 355 (I-355) and I-294 for the central portion of its routing.

History 

SBI Route 83 was modern Illinois Route 17 from New Boston to Galva. In 1941 it was changed to the Lynwood-to-Antioch routing, replacing Illinois Route 52 and IL 54. In 1998, IL 83 was routed slightly north onto 127th Street, from Cal Sag Road. The renumbering was part of a major reconstruction project of the IL 50 intersection with I-294 (Tri-State Tollway). 

As part of sign replacement accompanying the renumbering, IL 83 was added to the northbound IL 50 exit from southbound I-294, as the new northbound IL 50 ramp leads directly to IL 83 first. However, IL 83 overlaps IL 50 southbound at the center of the interchange, so southbound IL 50 traffic also joins IL 83 at the end of the ramp. This is not reflected in the current signage on the tollway.

A $13.4 million construction project was completed in northern Lake County by improving a  section of IL 83 from Petite Lake Road to the Wisconsin state line. Improvements included adding a center turn lane and intersection modernizations at Grass Lake Road, IL 173, and North Avenue. The project was completed in fall 2010.

Major intersections

References

External links

Illinois Highway Ends: Illinois Route 83

083
Expressways in the Chicago area
Transportation in Cook County, Illinois
Transportation in DuPage County, Illinois
Transportation in Lake County, Illinois